Edward Owusu (born 15 March 1944) is a Ghanaian former sprinter who competed in the 1968 Summer Olympics.

References

1944 births
Living people
Ghanaian male sprinters
Olympic athletes of Ghana
Athletes (track and field) at the 1968 Summer Olympics
Commonwealth Games silver medallists for Ghana
Athletes (track and field) at the 1970 British Commonwealth Games
Commonwealth Games medallists in athletics
Medallists at the 1970 British Commonwealth Games